The Symphony Sessions was a live album released in December 1989 by Tom Cochrane & Red Rider. It was the band's seventh and final album.

The album was recorded with the Edmonton Symphony Orchestra at the Northern Alberta Jubilee Auditorium in Edmonton, Alberta. The concert featured a 56-piece orchestra, including six players who had performed with Procol Harum at that band's legendary 1971 performance with the Edmonton Symphony Orchestra.

Following this album, Tom Cochrane pursued a solo career, releasing Mad Mad World in 1991.

Background and writing
The album was recorded by Biff Dawes and the Westwood One mobile unit over two days and featured on one of the "Westwood One live" concert series shows.  Two tracks recorded during these sessions were featured on the Westwood One concert but did not make the final album cut: "Ocean Blues (Emotion Blue)" and "The Untouchable One".  Both songs are from the 1986 self-titled Tom Cochrane & Red Rider album.

Tom Cochrane explained the idea behind the album: "When we put our songs together... Kenny (Greer) has sort of a classical background, as I do... we never had the budget or the means to do it with these kind of players, plus you want to keep it intact as a band, so we've always done it with synthesizers and whatever we had at hand, so it's nice to go in with a real complement of players and have them contribute like they did.  In our music, "Lunatic Fringe," for example, there are parts implied that we thought should be transposed from keyboard to orchestral instruments, and then in other areas we gave George (Blondheim) carte blanche and said, 'Do what you want, add some creative input'. "

The concerts were recorded live with a 56-piece orchestra and then mixed down at the Metalworks Studios in Toronto.

Track listing

Album credits

Personnel
 Tom Cochrane - vocals, guitars
 Ken Greer - guitars
 John Webster - keyboards
 Ken "Spider" Sinnaeve - bass
 Randall Coryell - drums
 Peter Mueller - guitars

Additional personnel
 Edmonton Symphony Orchestra - orchestral performances

Production
 George Blondheim - arrangement, conductor
 Bill Dawes - engineer
 Steve Rinkoff - producer on "The Next Life", mixing
 Hugh Cooper - additional engineering
 Brett Zilahi - Assistant Engineer

References
 Liner notes from the album, including excerpts from Tom Cochrane's interview with Andy Frost from Westwood One.

Red Rider albums
1989 live albums
Capitol Records live albums